Sean McAuley (born 23 June 1972) is a football coach and former player who serves as an assistant coach for Major League Soccer club Minnesota United FC. Born in England, he made one appearance for the Scotland U21 national team.

Playing career
Sheffield-born McAuley began his football career with Manchester United, signing on with the club as an apprentice in July 1988. He turned professional on 21 June 1990, but was sold to St Johnstone for £80,000 two years later, without having made a single appearance for the United first team.

Coaching career
McAuley was appointed Sheffield Wednesday's Academy head coach in January 2006.

He became caretaker manager of Sheffield Wednesday between the sacking of Paul Sturrock and the appointment of Brian Laws in late October and early November 2006 respectively. McAuley was in charge for four first-team games, winning three and drawing one. The victories were over Queens Park Rangers, Crystal Palace and Leicester City. The draw was a 2–2 scoreline at Wolverhampton Wanderers. Following the appointments of both Laws and Alan Irvine, he returned to his career as the Owls' Academy head coach.

Following the sacking of Brian Laws on 13 December 2009, McAuley was re-installed as caretaker manager, until a replacement could be found. His first game was a 2–0 home defeat to Swansea. He then went on to draw 2–2 with league leaders Newcastle United and lose 2–1 to Crystal Palace in the 3rd round of the FA Cup, both at home.

McAuley has been involved in Sheffield Wednesday's work to build partner relationships with clubs in North America. He has developed ties with clubs in northern California and Michigan, and in April 2009 he travelled to Canada to undertake coaching sessions with Victoria Highlanders.

However, in July 2012, Sean McAuley departed Sheffield Wednesday in order to become the Assistant Manager at Major League Soccer club Portland Timbers. McAuley previously played in Portland for the pre-MLS Timbers. In August 2018, McAuley joined James O'Connor's technical staff at Orlando City SC as an assistant coach. In January 2020, McAuley joined Adrian Heath's coaching staff at Minnesota United FC as an assistant coach.

Managerial statistics

Notes

External links
 Halifax Stats

1972 births
Living people
Footballers from Sheffield
English football managers
Manchester United F.C. players
St Johnstone F.C. players
Chesterfield F.C. players
Hartlepool United F.C. players
Scunthorpe United F.C. players
Scarborough F.C. players
Rochdale A.F.C. players
Halifax Town A.F.C. players
A-League (1995–2004) players
Portland Timbers (2001–2010) players
Sheffield Wednesday F.C. managers
Scotland under-21 international footballers
Portland Timbers non-playing staff
Association football defenders
Scottish expatriate sportspeople in the United States
Expatriate soccer players in the United States
Scottish expatriate footballers
English expatriate sportspeople in the United States
English expatriate footballers
Orlando City SC non-playing staff
English footballers